Peter Dreier is an American urban policy analyst, author, liberal commentator and college political science professor. He is the Dr. E.P. Clapp Distinguished Professor of Politics at Occidental College in Los Angeles, California.

Education 
Dreier graduated from Syracuse University with a B.A. in 1970 and from the University of Chicago with a Ph.D. in 1977.

Career 
Dreier was the Director of Housing at the Boston Redevelopment Authority and senior policy advisor to Boston Mayor Ray Flynn for nine years.

In January 1993, Dreier became a professor at Occidental College.

In 1993, Dreier was appointed by the Clinton administration to the advisory board of Resolution Trust Corporation.

Dreier is an urban policy analyst.

He is a member of the Democratic Socialists of America.

Works
 The 100 Greatest Americans of the 20th Century: A Social Justice Hall of Fame.

Peter Dreier, John H. Mollenkopf, Todd Swanstrom, Place Matters: Metropolitics for the Twenty-First Century, University Press of Kansas, 2004,

See also 
 List of Occidental College people
 Costa–Hawkins Rental Housing Act

References

External links
Content by Peter Dreier on the CommonDreams news website
Features by or with Peter Dreier on Bill Moyers' website
Features by Peter Dreier on Yes! magazine online
Content by Peter Dreier on the "LA Progressive" digital news site

Syracuse University alumni
University of Chicago alumni
Occidental College faculty
Living people
Members of the Democratic Socialists of America
American political scientists
1948 births